Budapest Business School (BBS) ( (BGE)) is a private business school, formerly a public university, specializing in business studies and social sciences in Budapest, Hungary. It was founded in 1857 by the merchants and bankers of Austria-Hungary in order to establish the economic vocational training of higher education in the Empire and in Central Europe. It is the oldest public business school in the world, and the second oldest among all business schools, after the ESCP.

The Budapest Business School is Hungary's market-leading and largest business school. It conducts education and research in leadership, economics, operations management, marketing, entrepreneurship, organizational behavior, and other areas. Its most acclaimed programs are finance, accounting, strategic management, and tourism. The School offers 12 Bachelor's degree programs, usually in a choice of English, French, German or Hungarian, and 12 Master's degree programs, of which the most popular ones are Master of Finance, Master of Management (equivalent to MBA), Master of International Business, and Master of Tourism Management. Moreover, it offers a PhD in Management and 51 post-graduate professional qualifications with either Hungarian, English, German, Dutch, or French state degree accreditations, being recognized within the European Union and throughout the world.

The university was still the market leader in the field of business higher education in 2019 in Hungary, with 6,200 first-year students, 6 percent more than in the previous year. In 2020, the Faculty of Finance and Accountancy finished first on the university faculty popularity list in Hungary. The Faculty of Commerce, Hospitality and Tourism, and the Faculty of International Management and Business were also among the 10 most popular Hungarian university faculties.

History and traditions
Budapest Business School was founded in 1857 as the Pest Academy of Commerce, which is the official predecessor of the BBS faculties College of Finance and Accountancy and the College of Catering, Commerce and Tourism. Pest Academy of Commerce (German: Pester Handelsakademie, Hungarian: Pesti Kereskedelmi Akadémia) was founded by the second president of the Pest Chamber of Commerce, József Appiano, Antal Valero (first president of the Pest Chamber of Commerce, and later Pest Mayor) and by Habsburg Emperor Francis Joseph. Initially, classes were conducted in German.

It was the first business school in Austria-Hungary and Central Europe. Furthermore, it is the oldest existing business school in the world, following the ESCP Europe with its campuses in Paris, London, Berlin, Madrid, and Torino. After the cities of Buda and Pest merged, the institution was renamed to Budapest Academy of Commerce. Most of the business professionals and economists of the country received their qualifications in the school as it was the only business school in the country at that time.

Győző Czigler designed the Alkomány street campus of the Budapest Academy of Commerce in 1882, and the construction was finished in 1885 when the construction of the Hungarian Parliament Building had begun directly next to it. The campus at Alkotmány street is still one of the main campuses of the Budapest Business School. BBS's campus at Markó street is also located in Downtown Budapest. It is also a monumental building, designed by Ferenc Kolbenheyer in neoclassical style in 1872. The Markó street campus of the Budapest Business School is a close but more modest kin of the top-ranked ETH Zurich, designed by Gottfried Semper and Gustav Zeuner. There is a famous Council Room at the Markó street campus called Lotz Room, full of paintings painted by Károly Lotz and Mór Than. Many of the conferences of the Hungarian Presidency of the Council of the European Union were held in this room and in other lecture rooms on the Markó street campus. Budapest Academy of Commerce was a private business school until 1949, when it was nationalised by the government, becoming a public business school.

After several re-namings, the College of Accountancy was established in 1953, and the College of Catering and Commerce was established in 1969. The forerunner of the College of International Management is the School of International Commerce, which was established in 1957. In January 2000, the colleges created the Budapest Business School and became faculties of the university.

Predecessors of the Budapest Business School

Campus and estate

 Faculty of Finance and Accountancy - FFA: The origins of the Faculty of Finance and Accounting can be traced back to the founding of the Pest Academy of Commerce in 1857, and thus its history was intertwined with KVIK until 1945, as specialists in trade and banking were trained in that institution (Higher School of Commerce) between the two world wars. Its campus is in Budapest, in district XIV., Buzogány street 10-12. College: Bagolyvár street College (1148 Budapest, Bagolyvár st. 6-10.).
 Faculty of International Management and Business - FIMB: The Foreign Trade Vocational School was established in 1957 for young graduates, where young people able to correspond in two foreign languages graduated. In 1962, the school was transformed into an independent Higher Foreign Trade Vocational School. The foreign trade and commodity trade program was started in 1964. The institution was transformed into a college in 1971 under the name of the College of Foreign Trade. Specialist in-service training began in 1986; teaching Arabic and Japanese began. Its campus is in Budapest, in district XVI., Diósy Lajos street 22-24. College: Mátyásföld College (1165 Budapest, Diósy Lajos st. 22-24.).
 Faculty of Commerce, Hospitality and Tourism - FCHT: The origin of FCHT can be traced back to the establishment of the Pest Academy of Commerce in 1857, and thus its history was intertwined with the Faculty of Finance and Accounting until 1945. Its campus is in Budapest, in district V., Alkotmány street 9-11. College: Gyula Lengyel College (1113 Budapest, Laufenauer st. 1-7.).
 Doctoral School of Entrepreneurship and Business - DSEB: Its campus is in Budapest, in the district XIV., Buzogány street 10-12.

Academic profile
The University has teaching and education, research, and related organisational units, performing service, administrative, organisational and management tasks. The Academic Organisation and the Chancellery, as two pillars, form the main organisational units that ensure the sustainability and realisation of the university's goals. The Academic Organisation participates in the supervision of the basic activities of education and research, in the creation of the relevant strategy, and also supervises the management of all educational, research, and public education institutions outside the faculty organisations. Current educational, academic and research departments are the following:

 Institute of Foreign Languages and Communication
 Institute of Commerce and Marketing
 Institute of Economics
 Institute of Quantitative Methods
 Institute of Management and Business IT
 Institute of International Business Economics
 Institute of Finance and Accountancy
 Institute of Social Sciences and Pedagogy
 Institute of Tourism and Hospitality
 Doctoral School of Entrepreneurship and Business

At the university can be chosen from 10 BA/BSc programs during the admission process in English:

 Human Resources
 Business Administration and Management 
 Business Information Technology 
 Commerce and Marketing 
 Communication and Media Science 
 Community Coordination 
 International Business Economics 
 International Relations
 Finance and Accounting 
 Teacher of Economics
 Tourism and Catering

There are currently 9 MA/MSc programs available at BBS:

 Marketing 
 International Economy and Business 
 International Relations 
 Finance 
 Accounting 
 Teacher of Economics 
 Tourism Management 
 Business Management 
 Economist in Management and Leadership

BBS Doctoral School of Entrepreneurship and Business focuses on businesses and their development. It places emphasis on the business and management topics of SMEs at the heart of its training and research. The program aims to train researchers in the field of social science and in the area of management and organizational sciences, including the field of business research. The doctoral school's programs are based on Master's degrees in economics.
 Ph.D. in Entrepreneurship and Business

Research
The faculties of BBS have published 3,401 publications from 2016 to 2019. In 2019, BBS faculty and researchers published 655 scientific publications, 34 of which were articles in internationally highly rated journals (rated D1, Q1-Q4). The vast majority of the University's publications during this period were scientific publications (93%), with about 5% of the publications being educational and 2% educational. Between 2015 and 2019, 55% of BBS's publications were in Hungarian and 45% in foreign languages. An important tool for scientific dissemination is BBS’s Prosperitas journal, of which we publish four editions a year, and in addition to which the faculties have published a number of professional periodicals. BBS publications reached a number of researchers, the number of citations to the publications between 2015 and 2019 was 1,339, of which 1,150 were independent citations.

There are currently more than 60 research groups at BBS and in 2019, the Research Fund's application system funded 7 researches at the university as well. Reflecting on the strategic areas of BBS, established four centres of excellence at the university that focus on the four main areas of our applied research: 
Budapest LAB Entrepreneurship Centre, Centre of Excellence for Sustainable Hospitality, Future of Higher Education Research Centre, Centre of Excellence for Cybereconomy. The Centres of Excellence are dominant in Hungary in their field of professional activity, they play an important role in the relationship between higher education and companies, and they also carry out high-quality applied scientific research relevant to practice with the involvement of corporate partners and students. The staff of FHERC won the 2019 Professional Award of the Subcommittee on Management and Organizational Sciences of the Hungarian Academy of Sciences in the category of foreign journal articles. The article is about participatory research on the future of higher education and was published in the Journal of Futures Studies (Q2). From 2020, the Hungarian partner of the world's largest enterprise research, the Global Entrepreneurship Monitor (GEM), is BBS, and the research center within the university is also Budapest LAB.

In 2019, the proportion of PhD-qualified lecturers exceeded 55%. Many BBS lecturers and professors are members of the various scientific committees of the Hungarian Academy of Sciences, certain committees of the Hungarian Rectors' Conference, and leading and opinion-forming representatives in international and domestic professional organizations. An important task for BBS is to disseminate professional knowledge and shape social attitudes.

The scientific activities of the BBS are managed by the Vice-Rector for Research, who is supported by the Vice Deans for Research of the Faculty. The Vice-Rector may rely on the Scientific Council and the Research Society to discuss scientific issues and make decisions on scientific matters. The lecturers of BBS evaluate outstanding scientific achievement with the BBS Scientific Prize, which is announced annually and presented in the framework of the Hungarian Science Festival conference series. We also give special recognition - the Excellent Mentoring Award - to professors who excel based on the results of the Students’ Research Societies activity.

At the BBS Centre for Research Services, offered support for high-level and applied research as well as research-based projects related to student talent promotion and teaching methodology. The goal is to encourage BBS citizens as possible to conduct high-quality research, and to provide intellectual, research-methodological support for this. To improve research skills, it organizes and holds workshops and training, provides personalized guidance, and research methodological consultation to researchers and students, and works on the systematization and flow of information related to research.

On BBS Knowledge Map, it organises and reviews nearly 150 group and individual research projects of the last five years from different perspectives. The database includes more than 260 employees involved in the implementation of research and more than 70 collaborating partners, including foreign and domestic universities, companies, research institutes and non-governmental organizations.

The Oriental Business and Innovation Center (OBIC) was established in 2016 by the Budapest Business School and the Hungarian National Bank. The general goal of OBIC is to improve the competitiveness of the Hungarian economy through an understanding of the experience of the East Asian region, including the direct channelling of Asian economic development experience into the Hungarian national economy, as well as the development of educational, research, cultural and economic relations between Hungary and East Asian countries.

In 2017, the Hungarian Academy of Sciences-BBS Macroeconomic Sustainability Research Group was established, within the framework of which nearly 100 publications have been published by the university's lecturers on the topic.

Student life
BBS has nearly 25 student organizations, most of which are related to economics and business related to the university's profile, but also publishes several student journals and offers opportunities to participate in other leisure and creative activities. In addition, the renewed BBS Day across the institution carries on the tradition of the deservedly famous Generations Meeting in a new form, with cooking competitions, concerts, and many other programs bringing together participating staff and students. Furthermore, the regularly organized cultural mini-festival, Manifeszt, brings the world of Hungarian culture closer to the students in the form of theater performances, podium talks, workshops, concerts, and exhibitions of students' work.

There are three specialized Colleges at BBS, which can be linked to the Faculties of the University, the Miklós Káldor College at the FIMB, the Károly Gundel College at the FCHT, and the Sándor Lámfalussy Vocational College at the FFA. The task of the Colleges is to operate student-forming student organizations with high-quality professional training, the aim of which is to educate professionally demanding and responsible intellectuals sensitive to economic, business, and social problems and to support talented students.

Colleges are also active in Students’ Research Societies (TDK) activities, organizing professional and community events, and study competitions. They represent the university in about 10 international and 30-40 domestic competitions a year, of which an average of 2 international and 10 domestic places are taken. Students’ Research Societies is the arena of academic community experiences and talent development in Hungarian higher education, which dates back more than half a century. TDK is Hungaricum, nowhere else in the world is there such an initiative. Another important element of BBS's scientific activity is student talent management, the defining field of which is a scientific student activity, so there are successful Students’ Research Societies in all faculties of their University, aiming at mentoring, talent management, exploring scientific experiences, and researching exciting areas.

With the coaching background provided by the Physical Education and Sports Center, students have the opportunity to prepare for and join the Budapest, national and international university championships. In addition to domestic and international competition preparation, the school also organizes home tournaments, university sports days, and sports circles. The students of the university have achieved outstanding results in recent years in swimming, athletics, fencing, and wrestling, as well as in water polo, volleyball, and basketball. In 2019, the BBS water polo team, which won the Hungarian University and College National Water Polo Championship, also closed on the podium at the European Universities Championships in Koper, Slovenia.

International partnerships

The Budapest Business School (BBS) is a higher education institution with wide-ranging international relations. It has active connections with more than 200 foreign higher education institutions in nearly 50 countries on five continents. There are academic programs in international cooperation at several levels at BBS. Students taking part in the International Business Economics program in English can be awarded the degree of a Dutch partner institution, the Avans Hogeschool's International School, Breda or a German partner HEI, the Fachhochschule Frankfurt am Main University of Applied Sciences, Frankfurt am Main. The same study program in French is jointly run with the University of Picardie Jules Verne in Amiens. Graduates of this program are also awarded a French degree. In addition to the dual award program, there are three bachelor programs running in a foreign language: Commerce and Marketing in English and German, Finance and Accounting in English, and Tourism and Catering in English and German. BBS takes part in numerous international projects - either as a consortium leader or consortium partner. At present BBS has exchange agreements with more than 170 institutions of higher education in nearly 30 countries and we have a wide range of Finnish, French, German, and Spanish connections within the framework of the Erasmus program. BBS is noted for its wider-ranging Asian relations that include cooperation with Japanese, Chinese, Indian, Russian, Thai, and Vietnamese higher education institutions.

Rankings and reputation
 According to the Figyelő Higher Education Ranking 2021, the median income of all recent Hungarian university graduates is the 4th highest at BBS with HUF 344 thousand, the 3rd is the University of Óbuda with IT profile with HUF 350 thousand, the 2nd is the Corvinus University with HUF 361 thousand, and the first is also IT profile BME with HUF 371 thousand.
 78 percent of the graduating students at BBS already have full-time employment at the time of obtaining graduation, which may prove that BBS was still the market leader in the field of business higher education in 2019 in Hungary, 6,200 first-year students, most among Hungarian universities were able to start their studies, 6 percent more than in the previous year. In 2020, the Faculty of Finance and Accountancy finished first on the university faculty popularity list in Hungary, and the other two, the Faculty of Commerce, Hospitality and Tourism and the Faculty of International Management and Business were also among the 10 most popular Hungarian university faculties.
 According to the HVG Diploma 2019, BBS-FCHT ranks 2nd and BBS-FIMB 4th among the Hungarian faculties of economics in terms of student excellence, which includes the number of first-place applicants, the average number of students admitted, the proportion of those admitted to the language test and the number of those placed in the study competition.
 In the category of universities, BBS won Higher Education Quality Award together with the Corvinus University of Budapest in 2010.
 By the Spanish National Research Council, BBS is ranked on Webometrics Research as the #1 business school in Hungary, #33 in Europe, and #66 in the world in 2020 among Business schools. 
 According to the research of the Institute for Economic and Enterprise Research (GVI) conducted with top managers in 2009, shown in the HVG Diploma Magazine, Budapest Business School is #1 in the areas of finance, accounting, economic analyses, human resource management, and tourism management among all the universities in Hungary, and is also ranked top 3 in any other business and economic study areas
 BBS provides the most valuable degrees and the best quality education in business management, HR management, commerce and marketing, international business, finance, and accounting among all the universities in Hungary by Népszabadság Top 25 Degrees research in 2007
 By Felvi.hu Rankings (National Higher Education Information Center), with 14,986 applicants in 2011, BBS is by far the most popular business school in Hungary, and the most popular university in Budapest after the Eötvös Loránd University
 Felvi.hu Rankings 2010 ranks BBS #1 in quality of business education economics among all the Hungarian business schools
 Felvi.hu Rankings 2010 ranks BBS #2 in value of its degrees in business
 Felvi.hu Rankings 2010 ranks BBS #1 in the difficulty of its degree programs in business
 Heti Válasz Rankings and CEMI (Central European Management Intelligence) research in 2011, conducted with business managers and HR companies, ranks BBS #1 among all universities in Hungary

Notable alumni
BBS Alumni aim to keep their graduates as members of the community, who continually nurture their professional and human relationships while providing community space for former students to network and lifelong learning. The alumni organization regularly sends out newsletters about outstanding events and news in the life of BBS, and organizes the annual Faculty Alumni Meetings and occasionally scientific, cultural, and training programs for former students. Within the framework of the alumni, an anniversary publication entitled The Chronicle of the First 40 Years has already been published on the occasion of the 40th anniversary of FCHT.

According to the LinkedIn BBS Alumni of 32,000 people in 2021, the university’s graduates are also in significant numbers in the government, political and diplomatic sectors, but the most common is that they enter careers in business, with 15 largest employers of graduates being the following large companies with the most competitive workforce: BP, Vodafone, Paramount (Viacomcbs), Tesla, Google, Microsoft, Diageo, IBM, Citibank, ExxonMobil, OTP Bank, Morgan Stanley, Roche, Ernst & Young,  MOL Group, KPMG, K&H Bank,  Bosch, Deloitte, PriceWaterhouseCoopers. But the university itself is also the largest employer among its graduates who choose an academic career, and several universities are also well represented in terms of the placement of graduates.

References

External links 

 Official Facebook page of the university
 Official website of the university

Economics schools
Public administration schools
Journalism schools in Europe
Business schools in Hungary
Universities in Budapest
Public universities
Educational institutions established in 1857
1857 establishments in Hungary